Kurt Thomas may refer to:
 Kurt Thomas (composer) (1904–1973), German composer, conductor, and music educator
 Kurt Thomas (gymnast) (1956–2020), American gymnast
 Kurt Thomas (basketball) (born 1972), American basketball player

See also 
 Curtis Thomas, American politician
 Kurt St. Thomas (born 1963), American filmmaker, author, and disc jockey